A stephane (ancient Greek στέφανος, from στέφω (stéphō, “I encircle”), Lat. Stephanus = wreath, decorative wreath worn on the head; crown) was a decorative headband or circlet made of metal, often seen in depictions high-status ancient Roman and Greek women, as well as goddesses. The stephane often consisted of a metal arc that was higher in the center than along the sides, which was set atop a woman's hair, with or without a veil.  It resembled a crown.

Many ancient Greek and Roman coins show on obverse queen's portrait wearing a veil with a stephane.

See also
 Clothing in the ancient world
Clothing in ancient Greece
 Chiton (costume) 
 Exomis
 Himation
 Peplos
 Zoster (costume)

References

Headgear